My Love and I is a 1964 Swedish thriller film directed by Gunnar Höglund. It was entered into the 15th Berlin International Film Festival. It was released on DVD in March 2008.

Cast
 Mathias Henrikson - Du (You)
 Maude Adelson - Leni Wodak
 Lars Lind - Den andre (Other Man)
 Guy de la Berg - German Tourist
 Josef Blind - Andreas

Production
The film was shot along Kungsleden in Lapland and in the studios of Omega-Films in Stockholm.

References

External links

1964 films
1960s Swedish-language films
1960s thriller films
Swedish black-and-white films
Films directed by Gunnar Höglund
Swedish thriller films
1960s Swedish films